Mokelumne City (Mokelumne, Miwok for "People of the Fish Net") is a ghost town in San Joaquin County, California, United States. Mokelumne, established in 1850, was the second largest town in San Joaquin County until it was destroyed by the floods of 1862.

Mokelumne City arose as a rival trade centre to Stockton in 1850, near the mouth of the Cosumnes River, at the confluence of the Cosumnes and Mokelumne Rivers. 
Sloops built there ran direct to San Francisco. It rose to poll 172 votes, but the Great Flood of 1862 so ravaged the place that it never recovered.

The site of the former city is located about 14 miles north-west of Lodi, California.  It is 200 feet north of the intersection of Cameron Road and Thornton Road, 3 miles north of Thornton, California.

References

External links
 California Historical Landmarks in San Joaquin County, California Landmark 162, Mokelumne City Site
MOKELUMNE CITY from www.ghosttowns.com 
 Thornton, California from galthistory.org 

Former settlements in San Joaquin County, California
Ghost towns in California
Populated places established in 1850
1850 establishments in California